Shir Khani (also Romanized as Shīr Khānī) is a village in Zagheh Rural District, Zagheh District, Khorramabad County, Lorestan Province, Iran. At the 2006 census, its population was 93, in 16 families.

References 

Towns and villages in Khorramabad County